Elections for Ipswich Borough Council were held on Thursday 5 May 2011. One third of the seats were up for election and the Labour Party gained control of the council, which had previously been run under by a Conservative - Liberal Democrat coalition since 2004.

After the election, the composition of the council was:

Labour 28
Conservative 16
Liberal Democrat 4

Ward results

Alexandra

Bixley

Bridge

Castle Hill

Gainsborough

Gipping

Holywells

Priory Heath

Rushmere

Sprites

St John's

St Margaret's

Stoke Park

Westgate

Whitehouse

Whitton

References

2011 English local elections
2011
2010s in Suffolk